Danilo Nicolás Suárez García (born March 7, 1989 )  is a Uruguayan professional footballer who plays as a goalkeeper for Deportivo Marquense in the Liga Nacional de Fútbol de Guatemala.

Club career
Suarez started his career playing with Tacuarembó. He made his professional debut during the 2014/15 season.

References

1994 births
Living people
Uruguayan footballers
Club Atlético River Plate (Montevideo) players
Tacuarembó F.C. players
Miramar Misiones players
Association football goalkeepers